"Aliens" (stylised as "A L I E N S") is a song by British rock band Coldplay. It was written by all four members of the band along with Brian Eno, who also handled the production with Markus Dravs and Rik Simpson. The track was released on 6 July 2017 as a charity single and the third excerpt from Coldplay's thirteenth EP Kaleidoscope (2017) after "Hypnotised" and "All I Can Think About Is You". The proceeds from the song were donated to the international NGO Migrant Offshore Aid Station, which rescues migrants and refugees in peril at sea in the Mediterranean. On 21 July, a remix by Markus Dravs was released.

Critical reception
Jeremy Gordon of Spin magazine wrote: "The skittering percussion and swirling electronics that open up the song are completely dissimilar from the EDM components they picked up on the way to their regrettable successful Chainsmokers collaboration; the spooky tones permeating the spaces in between Martin's indefatigably earnest vocals sound like background music from an X-Files episode. The song is constantly in motion, as all the elements pulse and hum in the same direction. It's cluttered, but not distracting. Martin's lyrics, which address the refugee crisis, lean hard on the maudlin side, which is not an unfamiliar space for the band to be." Althea Legaspi of Rolling Stone magazine wrote: "The song's pulsating rhythms emulate the racing heartbeat that might accompany searching for safety in a bleak world." Bianca Gracie of Fuse called the melody "blippy" and "space-age". Darragh Berry of Joe wrote that the song has "the distinctive Coldplay sound" and called the lyrics "deep" and "meaningful".

Music video
The animated lyrics video was directed by Diane Martel and Ben Jones. It shows a family running from explosions on the ground and foreboding creatures in the sky, as they escape from a planet.

Track listing

Credits and personnel
Credits adapted from Tidal.

 Guy Berryman – composing, keyboard, bass guitar
 Will Champion – composing, keyboard, drums, programming
 Jonny Buckland – composing, electric guitar
 Chris Martin – composing, vocals, keyboard, acoustic guitar
 Brian Eno – composing, producing, background vocals, guitar
 Markus Dravs – producing
 Rik Simpson – producing, background vocals, mixing
 Chris Allgood – mastering engineering
 Emily Lazar – mastering engineering
 Daniel Green – co-producing, engineering, keyboard
 Anthony De Souza – engineering
 John Metcalfe – engineering, strings, viola, violin, recording
 Bill Rahko – engineering
 Laurence Anslow – assisting
 Aleks Von Korff – assisting
 Tom Bailey – assisting
 Owen Butcher – assisting
 Andrew Rugg – assistant engineering
 Robin Baynton – assistant engineering
 Davide Rossi – cello

Charts

References

2017 singles
2017 songs
Animated music videos
Coldplay songs
Music videos directed by Diane Martel
Parlophone singles
Song recordings produced by Brian Eno
Song recordings produced by Rik Simpson
Songs written by Brian Eno
Songs written by Chris Martin
Songs written by Guy Berryman
Songs written by Jonny Buckland
Songs written by Will Champion